William Goldenberg (born November 2, 1959) is an American film editor. He has more than twenty film and television credits since 1992. He won the Academy Award for Best Film Editing for the film Argo (2012), and has been nominated for The Insider (1999), Seabiscuit (2003), Zero Dark Thirty (2012) and The Imitation Game (2014). He has also received nominations for nine other editing-related awards.

Goldenberg has had an extended, notable collaboration with the director Michael Mann.

Goldenberg has been elected to membership in the American Cinema Editors.

Filmography (selected)

See also

List of film director and editor collaborations

References

Further reading
 Lytal's interview with Goldenberg.

American film editors
American Cinema Editors
Living people
1959 births
Best Editing BAFTA Award winners
Best Film Editing Academy Award winners